The 2008 Dutch Open was the 36th edition of the Dutch Open.

Draw

Dutch Open (darts)